Tyler Thomas (born September 28, 1990) is an American football running back for the Cedar Rapids Titans of the Indoor Football League (IFL). He played college football at Bacone College and attended Jackson High School in Jackson, Michigan. He has been a member of the Edmonton Eskimos and Winnipeg Blue Bombers of the Canadian Football League (CFL).

College career
Thomas recorded 133 carries for 822 yards and eight touchdowns; 15 receptions for 134 yards and one touchdown; and 12 kickoff returns for 478 yards and one touchdown in his last season for the Bacone Warriors. He was named Bacone's 2012 Offensive Most Valuable Player and the Offensive Player of the Year in the Central States Football League.

Professional career

Edmonton Eskimos
Thomas signed with the Edmonton Eskimos on May 5, 2014. He was released by the Eskimos on March 16, 2015.

Winnipeg Blue Bombers
Thomas was signed to the Winnipeg Blue Bombers' practice roster on August 5, 2015. He was released by the team on September 4, 2015.

Cedar Rapids Titans
On September 27, 2017, Thomas signed with the Cedar Rapids Titans.

References

External links
NFL Draft Scout
Edmonton Eskimos profile
Winnipeg Blue Bombers profile

Living people
1990 births
African-American players of American football
African-American players of Canadian football
American football running backs
Bacone Warriors football players
Canadian football running backs
Edmonton Elks players
Winnipeg Blue Bombers players
Cedar Rapids River Kings players
Sportspeople from Jackson, Michigan
Players of American football from Michigan
21st-century African-American sportspeople